Ezbet El Borg (also transliterated , lit. Village of the Tower) is a coastal city with a large fishing industry in Damietta Governorate, Egypt. It is 15 km (9 mi) northeast of Damietta, and 210 km (130 mi) from Cairo. Its population is approximately 70,000.

The city is situated on the northern coast of Egypt at the mouth of the Damietta river, a distributary of the Nile, opposite Ras El Bar.

History 

The city was named in reference to the defensive tower that once stood there ("Burj" in Arabic means tower).  In 1869, a  minaret was built to guide ships in the Mediterranean Sea, but this location is now just a shallow spot in the Nile riverbed.  The town was historically granted to the Syrian Kahil family by Muhammad Ali of Egypt.

In recent history, there were accusations of ballot stuffing at the local voting station during the 2007 Shura Council election.  The August 2009 Egyptian hostage escape from Somali pirates mostly involved sailors from the town.

Economy 

The city is home to approximately 10,000 fishermen (1% of Egypt's total), and the base of Egypt's largest fishing boat fleet, including boats of the traditional felucca type. The city is also home to a sardine-canning factory operated by the Edfina Company.  The fishing sector provides the main source of income for the locals. Many of the fishing boats venture far along the Eastern Mediterranean and the Red Sea.  It is also a center for ship and yacht-building in Egypt.  In 2014 and 2015, the fishermen of Ezbet El Borg were involved in a dispute with the Egyptian Authority for Maritime Safety regarding compliance with maritime safety standards.

See also
Ezbet El Nakhl
List of cities and towns in Egypt

References

External links
Photograph

Fishing communities
Mediterranean port cities and towns in Egypt
Populated places in Damietta Governorate